Roberta Lima (born 1974) is a Brazilian born Austrian video and performance artist.

Roberta Lima graduated with a degree in Architecture and Urban Planning at Universidade do Vale do Rio dos Sinos in southern Brazil. After she moved to Vienna she earned a Master's degree in Fine Arts and PhD in Philosophy at the Academy of Fine Arts Vienna.

References
Kapusta, Barbara, Lugbauer Stephan (Ed.). "Projects by Assignments". (Schlebrügge.Editor: Vienna), 2011.
Lima, Roberta. "Invasion: RNA Chips and Butterflies".  (Self-published: Vienna), 2008.
Pacher, Jörg. "Preface", in: Lima, Roberta. Invasion: RNA Chips and Butterflies. (Self-published: Vienna), 2008.
Thun-Hohenstein, Felicitas (Ed.). synchronicity: 11th Cairo Biennial Austrian Contribution. (Walther König: Vienna), 2009.
Lima, Roberta. "Thinking Praxis and Theory Inversely", in: Art & Research, Vol. 2, No. 2, (Glasgow Art School: Glasgow), 2009.
 Peterle, Astrid. "The Interpenetration of Body and Space. Roberta Lima’s performance art". EIKON International magazine for photography and media art. Issue 83. September 2013, p. 11.

External links

From Transgression to Transcription, by Roberta Lima published by CORPUS, an Internet Magazine for Dance, Choreography and Performance

21st-century Austrian women artists
Living people
1974 births
Academy of Fine Arts Vienna alumni